Cherak-e Bala (also Romanized as Cherāk-e Bālā; also known as Pas-e Gardaneh) is a village in Bondar Rural District, Senderk District, Minab County, Hormozgan Province, Iran. At the 2006 census, its population was 114, in 31 families.

References 

Populated places in Minab County